ORG-21465 is a synthetic neuroactive steroid, with sedative effects resulting from its action as a GABAA receptor positive allosteric modulator. It is similar to related drugs such as ORG-20599, and was similarly developed as an improved alternative to other sedative steroids such as althesin and allopregnanolone, which despite its superior properties in some respects has not proved to offer enough advantages to be accepted into clinical use.

Chemistry

See also 
 ORG-25435

References 

Neurosteroids
Anticonvulsants
Hypnotics
Morpholines
GABAA receptor positive allosteric modulators
Pregnanes